Charlotte Bravard (born 12 January 1992) is a French former professional racing cyclist, who rode professionally between 2011 and 2019 for the  and  teams. Bravard was the winner of the 2017 French National Road Race Championships. She currently works as a directeur sportif for UCI Women's Continental Team .

Personal life
Bravard's older sister  also competed professionally as a cyclist. In 2020, Bravard gave birth to a son – with her partner and fellow cyclist, Baptiste Bleier.

Major results

2014
 3rd Grand Prix de Plumelec-Morbihan Dames
 7th Overall Tour de Bretagne Féminin
 8th Road race, UEC European Under-23 Road Championships
2015
 4th Grand Prix de Plumelec-Morbihan Dames
2017
 1st  Road race, National Road Championships
 9th Chrono des Nations

See also
 List of 2015 UCI Women's Teams and riders

References

External links
 

1992 births
Living people
French female cyclists
Sportspeople from Dreux
Cyclists from Centre-Val de Loire
21st-century French women